Traditional games in Indonesia are games commonly played by Indonesian children and have roots / acculturated to the Indonesian native culture. Indonesian parents often using traditional games to educate their children about character building. As a result, nearly all children in the era before the 1990s play traditional games.

Without tools

Elephant ant man
This game played by 2 (two) people or more. it is similar with Rock-paper-scissors from China-Japan.

The player hide their right hands behind their heads.
They count out aloud One..Two..Three..Go!
On the word "go!", their hands come out in three ways; the thumb, index finger, or little finger is pointed toward the opposite player.

The pointed thumb is the elephant.
The pointed index finger is the man.
The pointed little finger is the ant.

The rules to decide who is winner:
Elephant wins over man because he can trample him.
Man wins over ant because he can step on him.
Ant wins over elephant because he can run up his trunk and tickle him to death.

Hom pim pa
Another variation of Rock-paper-scissors with much simpler rules. Played with three or more players using their palm and back of the hand.

All players sing together the song "Hompimpa alaium gambreng. Mpok Ipah pakai baju rombeng."
When the song is finished, all player's hand come out and show their hand side.
The different one is the winner.
Hom-Pim-Pa used to start several traditional games that rely on team decision-making.

Petak umpet
Petak umpet is Indonesian for hide and seek. Petak Umpet can be played by many players. Starting with Hom pim pah for deciding the cat or the seeker. The cat closed his/her eyes and faces the wall/tree as inglo (basecamp) for a while and count until 25 before The cat start looking for the other players. If the other players who are hiding touch the base, the game will be repeated again with the same cat. The game ends when all the players who are hiding are found, and the first discovered is the next cat.

With tools

Congklak

Congklak is a traditional game known by various names, on the Indonesian archipelago. The most common name, congklak, is taken from cowrie shell, which is commonly used to Playing Congklak. In Java, the games is known as congklak, dakon, dhakon, or dhakonan. In Lampung, the game is called dentuman lamban. In Sulawesi, Mokaotan, Maggaleceng, Aggalacang and Nogarata.

References